Elections for the Jharkhand Legislative Assembly were held in December 2009. It was a contest between three alliances The Indian National Congress (INC), The Bhartiya Janata Party (BJP) and its major ally Janata Dal (United), and the Jharkhand Mukti Morcha (JMM). The poll result was a shock for the incumbent BJP-JD(U) Alliance as they could muster only a quarter of the state assembly's 81 seats. The JMM emerged as a formidable force and finally turned out to be the kingmaker. The election turned out to be a stalemate as many expected because no major party or group was able to come even close to the 41-seat majority.

The JMM has always been an important factor in the state's political scenario even before the creation of the state. It then served as a rallying point for the people who demanded statehood for Jharkhand from Bihar.

Results

Results by constituency

Government Formation
A compromise formula was worked out between the BJP-JD(U) Alliance and the JMM. These two groups, with the help of independents and other minor parties, had run the state government, and the president rules the state.

References

2009
2009
2009 State Assembly elections in India